Centralteatret is a theatre on Akersgata in the city centre of Oslo, Norway.

Centralteatret was established by the husband and wife acting team of Johan Fahlstrøm  and Alma Fahlstrøm in 1897. The theatre was especially known for a repertoire of the light genre including comedy, revues and operettas, but also classics (such as Ibsen) and new Norwegian drama.

From 1902, Harald Otto  (1865–1928) was the theater manager and owner. His son, Reidar Otto (1890–1959) subsequently ran it, while his son, Harald Otto joined as manager in 1938. Members of the Otto family ran the theater until 1959.

Since 1959 the premises have been used partly as a television studio. Central theater is now renovated.  The hall has 387 seats. Centralteatret is Norway's oldest theater site in operation.

References

Theatres in Oslo
1897 establishments in Norway